Cominella olsoni is a species of predatory sea snail, a marine gastropod mollusc in the family Cominellidae, the true whelks.

References

 Powell A W B, New Zealand Mollusca, William Collins Publishers Ltd, Auckland, New Zealand 1979 

Cominellidae
Gastropods of New Zealand
Gastropods described in 1956